Kellie Casey (born November 29, 1965 in Toronto, Ontario) is a Canadian former alpine skier who competed in the 1988 Winter Olympics.

References

1965 births
Living people
Canadian female alpine skiers
Olympic alpine skiers of Canada
Alpine skiers at the 1988 Winter Olympics
Skiers from Toronto